Joachim Röther (born 5 March 1948) is a retired German backstroke swimmer who won a bronze medal in the 200 m backstroke at the 1966 European Aquatics Championships. He also competed at the 1968 Summer Olympics and finished seventh in the same event.

References

1948 births
East German male swimmers
Swimmers at the 1968 Summer Olympics
Male backstroke swimmers
Olympic swimmers of East Germany
Living people
European Aquatics Championships medalists in swimming
Sportspeople from Chemnitz